This is a list of British television related events from 1990.

Events

January
1 January 
New Year's Day highlights on BBC1 include the network television premiere of the 1985 romantic drama Out of Africa, starring Robert Redford and Meryl Streep as well as the 1982 musical sequel Grease 2.
Debut of the iconic sitcom Mr. Bean on ITV, starring Rowan Atkinson as the titular character. 
2 January 
Granada's flagship nightly news programme Granada Reports is rebranded as Granada Tonight.
The first episode of the sixth T-Bag series airs in which Georgina Hale debuts as Tabatha Bag, the second T-Bag.
The 30-minute weekday 6am Ceefax slot returns to BBC1, but rather than the special pages used for Ceefax AM, the content is the same as for all other Ceefax broadcasts.
3 January – The US animated series Teenage Mutant Hero Turtles makes its debut on BBC1. The show's original US title, Teenage Mutant Ninja Turtles is changed for the UK because of controversy surrounding ninjas and related weapons such as nunchaku. The intro sequence is heavily edited because of this, replacing the word ninja with hero or fighting, using a digitally faded logo instead of the animated blob and removing any scenes in which the character Michelangelo wields his nunchaku. Scenes of Michelangelo using his nunchaku are likewise edited out of the episodes themselves, leading the American producers to drop the weapons from the series entirely, in order to make the show more appropriate for the international market.
4 January – Debut of the sitcom One Foot in the Grave on BBC1, starring  Richard Wilson.
6 January 
The US action drama series Baywatch, starring David Hasselhoff and Pamela Anderson, makes its UK debut on ITV.  Made by NBC, the series proves popular with British viewers with audience figures regularly reaching 13 million. When NBC cancels the series after its first season, ITV teams up with an international consortium of broadcasters to sponsor the show for further seasons. The series comes to an end in 2001, following an eleven-year run.
Debut of Jekyll & Hyde on ITV, a made-for-television film starring Michael Caine and Cheryl Ladd.
8 January – The popular classic children's song Nellie the Elephant has been spawned into a five-minute animated cartoon series on ITV, featuring the voices of singer Lulu and Tony Robinson. The first episode is called Nellie and the Ghost and was shown every Monday until 9 April with the episode Nellie Rescues Mrs Maple's Moggy. The series will return on 5 September with Nellie Goes Ballooning and will be shifted onto a Wednesday timeslot. The last three episodes will be broadcast in January 1991 with the final one being shown on 21 January.
9 January – The Secret Cabaret, an innovative and shocking magic-based programme hosted by magician Simon Drake, makes its debut on Channel 4.
14 January – The Observer reports that TVS have started searching for a buyer for a 49% stake in US production company MTM Enterprises which it bought in 1988.
24 January–3 February – The BBC broadcasts the 1990 Commonwealth Games. BBC1 stays on the air all night to provide live coverage. This is the first time that BBC1 has provided full live coverage of an overseas Commonwealth Games with around 12 hours of live action broadcast each day.
27 January – The final episode of Bob's Full House is broadcast on BBC1. 
31 January – The network television premiere of the James Bond film A View to a Kill on ITV, starring Roger Moore, Tanya Roberts, Patrick Macnee, Christopher Walken and Grace Jones.
January 
For the first time, Emmerdale is networked across almost all of ITV, airing at 7pm on Tuesdays and Thursdays.
Chrysalis Television takes over the contract to produce LWT News.

February
2 February – The BBC Schools gay-themed television film Two of Us is given its first daytime showing on BBC2. It is shown in two parts, on consecutive Friday lunchtimes. The channel had previously shown the film late at night in March 1988.
5 February – Sky Movies is fully encrypted and becomes Sky's first pay channel.
11 February 
Live coverage is aired of the African National Congress leader Nelson Mandela's release from Victor Verster Prison, near Cape Town, South Africa.
Sky Movies broadcasts its first special event, the boxing fight between Mike Tyson and Buster Douglas.
13 February – The US science fiction series Quantum Leap makes its UK debut on BBC2, starring Scott Bakula and Dean Stockwell.
15 February – The hugely popular game show The Crystal Maze makes its debut on Channel 4, presented by Richard O'Brien.
19 February – The documentary series Cutting Edge makes its debut on Channel 4. 
20 February – Steve McFadden makes his first appearance as the EastEnders character Phil Mitchell. Ross Kemp's debut as Phil's brother, Grant would air two days later.

March
4 March – The Observer reports that it has formed a partnership with Central to create Central Observer, making environmental themed films for British Satellite Broadcasting and other terrestrial channels with funding from the charity Television Trust for the Environment.
12 March 
Ahead of the first free legislative election in the German Democratic Republic, BBC1 airs an edition of Panorama in which Fred Emery reports from the GDR and West Germany on the opportunities and strains facing the Germans.
The final episode of Blankety Blank presented by Les Dawson is broadcast on BBC1, although it would return in 1997 with Lily Savage as its host. 
20 March – Chancellor John Major delivers the first budget to be broadcast on television.
25 March – British Satellite Broadcasting launches on cable in the as a rival to Sky Television which launched the previous year. 
26 March 
The science-fiction soap Jupiter Moon makes its debut on the Galaxy channel. 150 episodes are commissioned, but only 108 are aired before the series is cancelled in December.
Debut of the game show Turnabout on BBC1, presented by Rob Curling. 
27 March – BBC1 airs the first of two flashback episodes of EastEnders as part of a storyline in which Diane Butcher, played by Sophie Lawrence ran away from home. The episodes show Frank Butcher (Mike Reid) going to meet his teenage daughter at King's Cross station after she contacted him following a three-month absence. Scenes showing Frank waiting for Diane and their subsequent reunion are interspersed with flashbacks to January showing her leaving home and living rough on the streets. Sophie Lawrence did research among real homeless people for the storyline.
28 March – ITV airs the Granada documentary drama, Who Bombed Birmingham?. The programme which looks at the 1974 Birmingham pub bombings and the conviction of the Birmingham Six names several people believed to have actually been behind the bombings.
31 March – Opportunity Knocks returns to BBC1 for the 1990 series with its original title and with Les Dawson as host.

April
3 April – ITV airs the First Tuesday documentary Sonia's Baby, the story of a woman's fight with the medical establishment to have a test tube baby using her late husband's sperm.
6 April – The Australian children's science-fiction comedy Round the Twist makes its UK debut on BBC1.
10 April – The UK's first Asian TV channel TV Asia launches and becomes Europe's first entertainment and information channel for the South Asian community from the Indian subcontinent. It initially broadcasts through the night during Sky One's downtime.
14 April – BBC2 begins showing the 91-part 1988 Indian serial, Mahabharat, a dramatisation of the epic poem the Mahabharata. The programme is shown in Hindi with English subtitles and is repeated the following day in a late-night slot on BBC1.
16 April 
BBC1 airs Nelson Mandela – an International Tribute, a concert held at Wembley Stadium in honour of Nelson Mandela. The concert features a number of prominent musicians, including Anita Baker, Tracy Chapman, Stanley Clarke, Natalie Cole, George Duke, Peter Gabriel and Patti LaBelle. Nelson Mandela himself is also in attendance.
BBC1 airs Wogan on Ice, a special edition of Terry Wogan's chat show that gives viewers a rare chance to see ice dancers Jayne Torvill and Christopher Dean performing together. The pair who achieved success during the 1984 Winter Olympics, are appearing together in the UK for the first time since 1985.
Debut of You've Been Framed! on ITV, presented by Jeremy Beadle. 
17 April – The Channel Four Daily is revamped in a bid to attract more viewers. Some of the segments are changed and the programme starts 30 minutes later, at 6:30am.
19 April – The original airdate of a French & Saunders episode featuring the sketch Modern Mother and Daughter which forms the basis of the hugely popular sitcom Absolutely Fabulous that started in 1992. 
21 April 
The BBC reverts to airing just one Summer Saturday morning magazine show and replaces On the Waterfront and UP2U with a new show, The 8.15 from Manchester, named after its start time and broadcast location.
The final episode of You Bet! presented by Bruce Forsyth, is broadcast on ITV.
29 April – British Satellite Broadcasting launches on satellite television.

May
5 May – Italy's Toto Cutugno wins the 1990 Eurovision Song Contest with Together: 1992 which is notable for a technical fault with Spain's entry from Azucar Moreno. 
6 May – The original airdate of the Everyman episode A Game of Soldiers, a documentary which concerns a group of soldiers exploring their feelings about being trained to kill.
10 May – The Broadcasting Bill receives its third reading in the House of Commons and is passed with 259 votes to 180.
19 May – Helen Rollason becomes the first female presenter of BBC1's Grandstand.
22 May – ITV airs Trojan Horse, an episode of The Bill in which the character PC Ken Melvin, played by Mark Powley is killed off while trying to park a booby trapped car when a bomb explodes.
25 May – The anarchic cult comedy series Vic Reeves Big Night Out makes its debut on Channel 4, starring Vic Reeves and Bob Mortimer. 
27–28 May – ITV stages its second nationwide Telethon.
28 May – ITV airs a special edition of Coronation Street as part of its Telethon in which Hilda Ogden (Jean Alexander) returns for a special visit.

June
1 June – The game show The $64,000 Question makes its debut on ITV, presented by Bob Monkhouse. 
2 June – Opportunity Knocks ends its run on BBC1 after four series with the 1990 final.
8 June–8 July – The BBC and ITV provide television coverage of the 1990 FIFA World Cup.
15 June – The long-running children's arts and crafts series Art Attack makes its debut on Children's ITV, presented by Neil Buchanan. 
 16 June – Pages from Ceefax is shown after 10am for the final time and as from 19 June, BBC2 begins broadcasting programmes when Daytime on Two is not on the air at 10am rather than at lunchtime.
20 June – Archie MacPherson commentates his last football match for BBC Scotland with the Scotland v Brazil World Cup match in Italy in which Brazil won 1–0 leaving Scotland eliminated from the finals. He was later replaced by Jock Brown as main commentator who had commentated the same match on STV when Sportscene returned on 25 August. Brown was replaced by Gerry McNee for Scotsport which was shown the following day.
24 June – The network television premiere of James Cameron's 1984 US science fiction film The Terminator on BBC2 as part of the channel's Moviedrome strand, starring Arnold Schwarzenegger, Linda Hamilton, Michael Biehn and Lance Henriksen.
28 June – The sitcom Waiting for God makes its debut on BBC1, starring Stephanie Cole.

July
2 July 
ITV airs Tom McGurk's film Dear Sarah, a play about Giuseppe Conlon's letters to his wife, Sarah after he was convicted as one of the Maguire Seven for allegedly making IRA bombs.
The Channel 4 game show Countdown celebrates its 1000th edition.
Debut of the cookery competition MasterChef on BBC1, presented by Loyd Grossman. 
5 July – The Tavernier family make their EastEnders debut with parents Celestine and Etta (played by Leroy Golding and Jacqui Gordon-Lawrence), their children Clyde (Steven Woodcock), Hattie (Michelle Gayle) and Lloyd (Garey Bridges) and grandfather Jules (Tommy Eytle).
6 July – Channel 4 introduces a third weekly episode of its soap Brookside, airing on a Friday evening. It now airs on Mondays, Wednesdays and Fridays.
7 July – In Rome, on the eve of the final of the 1990 FIFA World Cup, the Three Tenors sing together for the first time. The event is broadcast live on television and watched worldwide by millions of people. The main highlight is Luciano Pavarotti's performance of Nessun Dorma from Giacomo Puccini's opera Turandot.
9 July – [Anglia replaces its news programme About Anglia with Anglia News. It is a new dual news service with both editions broadcast from Norwich. Journalists are also based at seven regional newsrooms and a Westminster bureau. They also begin providing separate news services for the East and West of the Anglia region from that day.
13 July – The network television premiere of Michael Schultz's 1987 science-fiction adventure Timestalkers on BBC1, the film having been postponed from 25 June.
19 July – MPs vote to make televised proceedings of the House of Commons a permanent feature.
21 July – Debut of Stars in Their Eyes on ITV, a series presented by Leslie Crowther in which members of the public impersonate their favourite singers.
31 July – The final edition of Engineering Announcements is shown on Channel 4 at 5:45am.
July – Hey, Hey, it's Saturday! replaces Wac '90 as TV-am's flagship Saturday morning children's programme.

August
9 August – Debut of the sitcom Drop the Dead Donkey on Channel 4. 
10 August – Debut of The Word on Channel 4. 
14 August – BBC1 begins a repeat of the eight-part New Zealand action thriller Steel Riders.
18 August – BSB's second Marcopolo satellite is launched.
20 August – The final episode of Miami Vice, Freefall is broadcast on BBC1.
25 August – The first series of Stars in Their Eyes on ITV is won by Maxine Barrie, performing as Shirley Bassey.
31 August – The network television premiere of Miracles on BBC1, Jim Kouf's 1986 comedy starring Tom Conti and Teri Garr.

September
 1 September — Sky Movies begins broadcasting 24 hours a day. Previously the channel had broadcast shopping programmes between 6am and 2pm.
2 September 
The network television premiere of Heartsounds on BBC1, a film based on the autobiographical book by Martha Weinman Lear and stars James Garner and Mary Tyler Moore.
The long-running US animated series The Simpsons is broadcast in the UK for the first time, making its debut on Sky One. Call of the Simpsons is the first episode to be shown on Sky.
3 September – The children's series Rosie and Jim makes its debut on Children's ITV. 
5 September – The new BBC building at White City opens.
7 September – After an eight-year absence, The Generation Game returns to BBC1 with Bruce Forsyth as its returning host and Rosemarie Ford as its hostess.
8 September – Ahead of the UK broadcast of the 1,000th episode of Neighbours, BBC1 airs Neighbours 1,000th Episode Celebration, a TV special produced by Australia's Network Ten which brought together past and present cast members to mark the occasion.
9 September – As part of the Screen One series, BBC1 airs the groundbreaking comedy-drama Frankenstein's Baby which explores the subject of male pregnancy.
10 September – ThunderCats returns to BBC1 with the second half of the first series. However, because of the concerns involving the use of weapons brought about by Teenage Mutant Hero Turtles, the next batch of episodes will have all scenes of Panthro with his nunchakus entirely cut out.
13 September – BBC1 airs the 1,000th episode of Neighbours which features a storyline in which the characters Des Clarke and Jane Harris, played by Paul Keane and Annie Jones) become engaged.
15 September
Raymond Baxter introduces BBC1's live coverage of the fly-past and parade at Buckingham Palace as the Royal Air Force marks the 50th anniversary of the Battle of Britain.
BBC1 screens Horror Cafe, a late-night horror themed special with film-maker's and authors, such as John Carpenter, Clive Barker and Roger Corman telling scary stories.  Followed by the George A. Romero film  Martin the Vampire and Dr. Jekyll and Mr. Hyde, starring Spencer Tracy and Ingrid Bergman.
16 September – Cliff Michelmore introduces BBC1's coverage of the Battle of Britain Service from Westminster Abbey, conducted by the Archbishop of Canterbury Rev. Dr. Robert Runcie.
17 September – BBC1 airs a special edition of Blue Peter in which Yvette Fielding travels to Montserrat to report on efforts to rebuild the island which experienced widespread damage when it was struck by Hurricane Hugo on 17 September 1989.
22 September – Debut of Unsolved Mysteries on Sky One, presented by Robert Stack. It uses a documentary format to profile real-life mysteries featuring reenactments of unsolved crimes, conspiracy theories and unexplained paranormal phenomena.
23 September – Debut of the Screen One drama Sweet Nothing which deals with the subject of homeless young people in London.
24 September 
Yorkshire Television launches a third sub-regional news opt-out for south Yorkshire and north Derbyshire called South and is broadcast from Sheffield while East (Hull) continues to air in east Yorkshire, Lincolnshire and north Norfolk and Calendar News is broadcast to the rest of the region, west and north Yorkshire. 
Joan Bunting wins the 1990 series of MasterChef on BBC1. 
25 September – The children's animated fantasy series The Dreamstone makes its debut on ITV. 
26 September 
Star Trek: The Next Generation makes its UK debut on BBC2, with the feature-length episode Encounter at Farpoint.
After a nine-year absence, the long-running children's series How is revived as How 2 on ITV, presented by Fred Dinenage, Carol Vorderman and Gareth Jones. 
28 September – Debut of the panel game show Have I Got News For You? on BBC2, presented by Angus Deayton. 
30 September – The BSB channel Galaxy airs the pilot episode of Heil Honey I'm Home!, a controversial sitcom featuring a fictionalised Adolf Hitler and Eva Braun. The show attracts much criticism and is cancelled after one episode. Several other episodes were recorded, but none have ever been broadcast.

October
2 October – The First Tuesday documentary Swing Under the Swastika airs on ITV. The programme looks at jazz music under the Nazi regime and is narrated by Alan Plater.
3 October – The BBC Radio 1 comedy series The Mary Whitehouse Experience comes to television with a series on BBC2.
6 October – ITV screen the network television premiere of Tony Scott's blockbuster 1986 film Top Gun, starring Tom Cruise and Kelly McGillis.
15 October 
BBC1 launches a new weekday morning service called Daytime UK. Linked live from Birmingham and running for four hours, from 8:50am until lunchtime, the new service includes hourly regional news summaries, broadcast after the on-the-hour news bulletins.
Fireman Sam returns to BBC1 for a new series with a new character named Penny Morris.
18 October – That day's edition of BBC1's Question Time from Edinburgh becomes the first edition of the programme to feature six panellists after delays require the last-minute substitution of two guests. Tony Benn, Margaret Ewing, Andrew Neil and Malcolm Rifkind were originally scheduled to appear, but Menzies Campbell and Magnus Linklater are drafted in when Benn and Neil are late. They then arrive 20 minutes into the programme and join the discussion.
23 October – David Lynch's critically acclaimed serial drama Twin Peaks makes its UK debut at 9pm on BBC2.
29 October – Debut of the popular sitcom Keeping Up Appearances on BBC1, starring Patricia Routledge.
30 October – Debut of The Sentence, an eight-part BBC2 documentary series looking at life inside Glen Parva Young Offenders Institute near Leicester, Europe's largest prison of its type. It is the first time a television crew has been given access to the prison.

November
2 November – BSB merges with Sky Television, becoming British Sky Broadcasting. Of BSB's five channels, only two, The Movie Channel and The Sports Channel, remain on the air long-term, though both are eventually renamed. Galaxy is closed with its transponders handed over to Sky One, Now is replaced in the most part with Sky News and The Power Station remains on the air until 8 April 1991 before being replaced with MTV. 
8 November – The comedy sketch show Harry Enfield's Television Programme, later called Harry Enfield & Chums makes its debut on BBC2, Harry Enfield, Paul Whitehouse and Kathy Burke. 
9 November – The Word is moved from 6pm to a late-night timeslot on Channel 4. 
11 November – At 10:40pm, ITV airs an ITN News special in which Trevor McDonald talks to Saddam Hussein. In his first interview with a British broadcaster since his country's invasion of Kuwait in August, the Iraqi President calls for talks and attempts to link the ongoing Gulf crisis with the Palestinian issue.
12 November – The British/Swiss children's series Pingu makes its debut on BBC1.
14 November – Tim Whitnall succeeds Tyler Butterworth as alien Angelo in the ITV children's sitcom Mike and Angelo.
18 November–23 December – The BBC's serialisation of the Chronicles of Narnia concludes with the fourth and final story, The Silver Chair, being aired in six parts.
20 November 
The date of broadcaster John Sergeant's famous encounter with Margaret Thatcher on the steps of the British embassy in Paris. He was waiting for Thatcher in the hope of hearing her reaction to the first ballot in the party leadership contest of 1990, only to be pushed aside by her press secretary, Sir Bernard Ingham when Thatcher emerges from the building. Sergeant later wins the British Press Guild award for the most memorable broadcast of the year.
BBC1 airs The Maze – Enemies Within, an Inside Story special looking at life inside Northern Ireland's Maze Prison.
On that day’s episode of Emmerdale, Malandra Burrows (as Kathy Merrick) sings Just This Side of Love, a song that was later released by Burrows as a single. Released on 26 November, the song enters the UK Singles Chart at #44, before spending eight weeks in the top 60 and peaking at #11 on 22 December.
22 November – Following Margaret Thatcher's resignation as Prime Minister, that evening's edition of Question Time, broadcast from London's Barbican Centre, is transmitted in two parts, with two different panels. The first part features Enoch Powell, David Owen, James Callaghan and Simon Jenkins while Michael Howard, Nigel Lawson, Paddy Ashdown and Roy Hattersley are the panellists for the second part.
25 November 
The final episode of Howards' Way is broadcast on BBC1.
The original airdate of episode three of the ninth series of Spitting Image which concludes with a film showing footage of Britain's homeless crisis over which plays a parody of Dionne Warwick's 1964 song Walk on By. The piece is introduced as one of the legacies of Margaret Thatcher's government and is rare for the series in that no puppets were used.
November – The Broadcasting Act 1990 receives Royal Assent. The Act paves the way for the deregulation of the British commercial broadcasting industry and will have many consequences for the ITV system. The Act also sets out the terms of a license for a fifth UK television channel which would need to be a general entertainment channel with a remit for some public service broadcasting. Additionally, it is estimated that the channel's coverage would reach only 74% of the UK and a video retuning operation would need to be undertaken.

December
1 December – With the media watching, the two ends of the service tunnel of the Channel Tunnel are joined together, linking Britain and France for the first time since the Ice Age. A handshake then takes place between Englishman Graham Fagg and Frenchman Phillippe Cozette, after which British and French workers board trains to complete the first journey between the two countries.
2 December 
ITV airs a repeat of the first-ever episode of Coronation Street as the soap approaches its 30th anniversary.
Galaxy and Now are closed down and are replaced on the Marcopolo satellite by Sky One and Sky News, although arts programmes are shown for a short time as a weekend opt-out service from Sky News.
7 December – BBC2 airs Your Move, a pioneering interactive show in which the home audience are invited to play chess against grandmaster Jonathan Speelman using telephone voting to select each move.
9 December 
Cilla Black hosts Happy Birthday Coronation Street, an evening of entertainment on ITV to celebrate the 30th anniversary of the long–running soap. 
The Greek language channel Hellenic TV, the UK's first foreign-language service to be given a broadcast licence by the Independent Television Commission goes on the air in London.
16 December – The network television premiere of The Muppets Take Manhattan on BBC1, the third feature length film starring The Muppets.
24 December 
BBC1 airs feature-length episode of All Creatures Great and Small, the last to be shown in the long-running series.
The first Wallace & Gromit film, A Grand Day Out, makes its debut on Channel 4. The film itself already had its premiere a year earlier at an animation festival in Bristol and features the voice of Peter Sallis as Wallace. 
25 December 
The network television premiere of Steven Spielberg's 1982 science-fiction blockbuster E.T. the Extra-Terrestrial on BBC1, starring Dee Wallace, Peter Coyote and Henry Thomas.
Channel 4 airs The Coronation Street Birthday Lecture, a talk delivered by Labour politician Roy Hattersley in which he discusses aspects of the soap in front of an invited audience which includes some Coronation Street cast members. The programme also includes some classic clips from the series.
26 December 
The network television premiere of the 1986 supernatural horror film Poltergeist II: The Other Side on BBC1, starring JoBeth Williams and Craig T. Nelson, as well as Toto – Live in Paris, a rare live performance from Toto.
ITV airs a TV adaptation of R. D. Blackmore's historical romance Lorna Doone. The film, produced by Thames is noted for its choice of filming location, footage having been shot near Glasgow rather than in the novel's Exmoor setting.
27 December 
BBC1 airs the first part of the Australian film Bushfire Moon. The second part is shown the following day.
The network television premiere of Jim Henson's 1982 fantasy adventure The Dark Crystal on BBC2.
The network television premiere of My Left Foot, Jim Sheridan's 1989 biopic of the writer Christy Brown on ITV, starring Daniel Day-Lewis.
31 December – New Year's Eve highlights on BBC1 include the network television premiere of the 1987 romantic comedy Roxanne, a modern retelling of Edmond Rostand's 1897 verse play Cyrano de Bergerac, starring Steve Martin and Daryl Hannah.

Debuts

BBC1
3 January – Teenage Mutant Hero Turtles (1987–1996)
4 January – One Foot in the Grave (1990–2000)
6 January – Waterfront Beat (1990–1991)
8 January – The Further Adventures of SuperTed (1989)
20 January – Alfonso Bonzo (1990)
8 February – Mick and Mac (1990)
15 February 
Ben Elton: The Man from Auntie (1990–1994)
Dizzy Heights (1990–1993)
26 March – Turnabout (1990–1996)
6 April – Round the Twist (1990, 1992, 2000–2001)
21 April – The 8:15 from Manchester (1990–1991)
26 May – Takeover Bid (1990–1991)
28 June – Waiting for God (1990–1994)
2 July – MasterChef (1990–2001, 2005–present)
4 September – On the Up (1990–1992)
14 September – Bump (1990–1994)
22 September – Babar (1989–1991)
3 October 
Canned Carrott (1990–1992)
The Trials of Life (1990)
4 October – Uncle Jack (1990–1993)
11 October – Your Cheatin' Heart (1990)
28 October – The Green Man (1990)
29 October – Keeping Up Appearances (1990–1995)
12 November – Pingu (1986–2000, 2004–2006)
13 November – Forget Me Not Farm (1990–1991)
18 November 
The Silver Chair (1990)
House of Cards (1990)
23 December – The Inspector Alleyn Mysteries (1990–1994)

BBC2
10 January – Oranges Are Not the Only Fruit (1990)
13 February – Quantum Leap (1989–1993)
6 April – United (1990)
31 May – The March (1990)
19 September – Portrait of a Marriage (1990)
26 September – Star Trek: The Next Generation (1987–1994)
27 September – Rab C. Nesbitt (1990–2014)
28 September – Have I Got News for You (1990–present)
3 October – The Mary Whitehouse Experience (1990–1992)
7 October – Saban's Adventures of Pinocchio (1972–1973)
13 October – The Littl' Bits (1980)
23 October – Twin Peaks (1990–1991, 2017)
8 November – Harry Enfield's Television Programme (1990–1998)
22 November – Nicholas Craig Masterclass (1990–1992)

ITV
 1 January – Mr. Bean (1990–1995) 
 5 January – Stolen (1990)
 6 January 
Jekyll & Hyde (1990)
Baywatch (1989–2001)
 7 January – Rescue (1990)
 8 January – Nellie the Elephant (1990–1991)
 10 January – Wowser (1989)
 13 January – Yellowthread Street (1990) 
 20 January – Kappatoo (1990–1992)
 21 January – Tarrant on TV (1990–2006)
 27 January – Haggard (1990–1992)
 7 February 
El C.I.D. (1990–1992)
No Job for a Lady (1990–1992)
 21 February – Spatz (1990–1992)
 6 March – Chancer (1990–1991)
 25 March – Not with a Bang (1990)
 26 March – What-a-Mess (1979–1980, 1990)
 16 April – You've Been Framed! (1990–2022)
 20 April – The Chief (1990–1995)
 22 April 
Jeeves and Wooster (1990–1993)
Perfect Scoundrels (1990–1992)
 23 April  – 'Families (1990–1993)

 1 May – The Upper Hand (1990–1996)
 2 May – Up the Garden Path (1990–1993)
 19 May – Cannon and Ball's Casino (1990)
 30 May – Missing Persons (1990)
 1 June – The $64,000 Question (1990–1993)
 3 June – Shoot to Kill (1990)
 15 June – Art Attack (1990–2007)
 9 July – ITV News Anglia (1990–present)
 21 July – Stars in Their Eyes (1990–2006, 2015) 
 25 July – Cluedo (1990–1993)
 1 September – The New Adventures of Black Beauty  (1990–1993)
 3 September – Rosie and Jim (1990–2000)
 6 September – Emlyn's Moon (1990)
 7 September – The Piglet Files (1990–1992)
 21 September – Paddington Bear (1989–1990)
 24 September – Cannon and Balls Playhouse (1990)
 25 September – The Dreamstone (1990–1995)
 26 September – How 2 (1990–2006)
 9 October – She-Wolf of London (1990–1991)
 14 November – Medics (1990–1995)
 22 November – Sea Dragon (1990)
 25 November – Come Home, Charlie, and Face Them (1990)
 26 December – Lorna Doone (1990)
 28 December – Father Dowling Mysteries (1987–1991)
 29 December – The Widowmaker (1990)

Channel 4
2 January – Gophers! (1990)
9 January – The Secret Cabaret (1990–1992)
2 February – The Great Moghuls (1990)
15 February – The Crystal Maze (1990–1995, 2016–2020)
19 February – Cutting Edge (1990–present)
27 February – Nightingales (1990–1993)
27 March – Oh, Mr. Toad (1990)
5 May – Bright Sparks (1989)
10 May – My Two Dads (1987–1990)
25 May – Vic Reeves Big Night Out (1990–1991)
12 June – Set of Six (1990)
4 July – Don't Quote Me (1990)
14 July – Elly & Jools (1990)
29 July – A TV Dante (1990)
9 August – Drop the Dead Donkey (1990–1998)
10 August – The Word (1990–1995)
7 October – Bobobobs (1988–1989)
8 October – Centrepoint (1990)
24 December – A Grand Day Out (1989)
Unknown Nocturne (1990)Hero Hungry (1990)

S4C
17 September – Heno (1990–2003, 2012–present)

Sky One
2 September – The Simpsons (1989–present) (Repeated on BBC1 & BBC2 from 1996–2004 and Channel 4 from 2004–present)
3 September – Love at First Sight (1990–1992)
22 September – Unsolved Mysteries (1987–2002, 2008–2010, 2020)
3 October – Alien Nation (1989–1990)

Channels
New channels

Defunct channels

Rebranded channels

Ending this year
19 January – Home to Roost (1985–1990)
27 January – Bob's Full House (1984–1990)
16 February – Colin's Sandwich (1988–1990)
12 March – Blankety Blank (1979–1990, 1997–2002)
16 March – Campion (1989–1990)
25 March – Don't Wait Up (1983–1990)
9 April – The Labours of Erica (1989–1990)
2 June – Opportunity Knocks (1956–1978, 1987–1990)
6 June – Connections (1985–1990)
28 July – The Trap Door (1986–1990)
22 August – Fraggle Rock (1984–1990)
19 September – The Best of Magic (1989–1990)
1 October – Penny Crayon (1989–1990)
25 November Juke Box Jury (1959–1967, 1979, 1989–1990)
 Howards' Way (1985–1990)
27 November – The Paradise Club (1989–1990)
11 December – Huxley Pig (1989–1990)
13 December – The Brollys (1990)
15 December – Noel's Saturday Roadshow (1988–1990)
24 December – All Creatures Great and Small (1978–1990, 2020–present)
 Coconuts'' (1990)

Births
 1 March – Harry Eden, actor
 16 May – Thomas Brodie-Sangster, actor
 18 June – Jacob Anderson, actor
 24 June – Rosie Jones, comedian
 29 July – Joey Essex, reality TV personality
 17 October – Scarlett Moffatt, TV presenter

Deaths

See also
 1990 in British music
 1990 in British radio
 1990 in the United Kingdom
 List of British films of 1990

References